César Garin (16 December 1879, Arviers – 27 March 1951) was an Italian-born French  professional bicycle racer.

Garin competed as a professional cyclist from 1899–1906, and lived in Paris until his death at the age of 71.

His best results were: Roubaix – Bray-Dunes 1899 3rd;  Paris-Roubaix 1904 2nd; Tour de France, 1904 2nd on Stage 5 to Nantes.

His older brothers Maurice and Ambroise were also professional bicycle racers.

Notes 

1879 births
1951 deaths
French male cyclists
Italian emigrants to France
Cyclists from Aosta Valley
Italian male cyclists